Rajani Rai was a former Lieutenant Governor of Puducherry and an academic. She was governor from 23 April 1998 to 29 July 2002. She was from Nagpur, Maharashtra. She was a member of leader of the Bharatiya Jana Sangh and Bharatiya Janata Party. She died on August 29, 2013.

References

External links
https://web.archive.org/web/20070928060840/http://www.pon.nic.in/open/govern/BIO_LG.htm

Politicians from Nagpur
20th-century Indian women politicians
20th-century Indian politicians
Lieutenant Governors of Puducherry
Women state governors of India
Women in Puducherry politics
21st-century Indian women politicians
21st-century Indian politicians
Year of birth missing
Bharatiya Jana Sangh politicians
Bharatiya Janata Party politicians from Maharashtra
2013 deaths